Richard Nowell (fl. 1354) was an English politician.

He was a Member (MP) of the Parliament of England for Lancashire in 1354.

References

Year of birth missing
Year of death missing
English MPs 1354
Members of the Parliament of England (pre-1707) for Lancashire